Pavlo Platonovych Chubynsky (1839 – January 26, 1884) was a Ukrainian poet and ethnographer whose poem Shche ne vmerla Ukraina (Ukraine Has Not Yet Perished) was set to music and adapted as the Ukrainian national anthem.

Chubynsky was born in the Chubynsky's estate that was located just outside village Hora, Pereyaslav county, Poltava Governorate. Today the place is known as a separate village Chubynske, Boryspil Raion that is located midway between Kyiv and Boryspil International Airport in the Kyiv Oblast.

In 1863 the Ukrainian nationalist journal based in Lviv,  Meta (The Goal), published the poem but mistakenly ascribed it to Taras Shevchenko. In the same year it was set to music by the Galician composer Mykhailo Verbytsky (1815–1870), first for solo and later choral performance.  

This song was disseminated throughout Ukraine as a rallying point for nationalist sentiments, leading Pavlo Chubynsky to be seen as "negatively influencing peasants' minds" by the Russian Imperial government. They sought to neutralize his influence with assignments that isolated him, first to Archangelsk province.  When his work in that region was recognized internationally by his peers, Chubynsky was sent to Saint Petersburg to work in the Transport Ministry as a low-level official. He became paralyzed in 1880 and died four years later.

In 1917 the song with his lyrics was officially adopted as the anthem of the Ukrainian state. In 2003, the president of Ukraine modernized the anthem's lyrics.

References

1839 births
1884 deaths
People from Kyiv Oblast
Ukrainian nobility
Ukrainian poets
Ukrainian jurists
National anthem writers
Ukrainian ethnographers
Ukrainian public relations people
Hromada (society) members